Mokhlesabad (also Romanized as Mokhleşābād; also known as Mūkhlīsābād) is a village in Farmahin Rural District, in the Central District of Farahan County, Markazi Province, Iran. At the 2006 census, its population was 314, in 105 families.

References 

Populated places in Farahan County